is a Japanese actor.

Career
Shingo Tsurumi has appeared in the films such as Katsuhito Ishii's Shark Skin Man and Peach Hip Girl, Hideo Nakata's L: Change the World, and Tak Sakaguchi's Yakuza Weapon.

Filmography

Films
 Tonda Couple (1980)
 Typhoon Club (1985)
 The Sound of Waves (1985)
 Gonin (1995), Shigeru Hisamatsu
 Atashi wa juice (1996)
 Rasen (1998)
 Shark Skin Man and Peach Hip Girl (1999)
 Dead or Alive (1999)
 Kaza Hana (2000)
 Freeze Me (2000)
 Hysteric (2000)
 Sukedachiya Sukeroku (2001)
 Gun Crazy: A Woman from Nowhere (2002)
 Hitokiri Ginji (2003)
 Lakeside Murder Case (2004)
 The Thousand Year Fire (2004)
 My God, My God, Why Hast Thou Forsaken Me? (2005)
 Hinagon (2005)
 Lorelei: The Witch of the Pacific Ocean (2005)
 School Daze (2005)
 L: Change the World (2007)
 Hana Yori Dango Final (2008)
 Yakuza Weapon (2011)
 Life Back Then (2011)
 Kamen Rider × Kamen Rider Fourze & OOO: Movie War Mega Max (2011)
 Kamen Rider Fourze the Movie: Everyone, Space Is Here! (2012)
 Crow's Thumb (2012)
 The Great Passage (2013) - Murakoshi
 Kikaider Reboot (2014) - Gilbert Kanzaki
 Our Family (2014)
 The Vancouver Asahi (2014) - Tony Shishido
 My Hawaiian Discovery (2014)
 Gonin Saga (2015), Shigeru Hisamatsu
 Orange (2015)
 Sailor Suit and Machine Gun: Graduation (2016)
 The Sun (2016) - Seiji Soga
 Shin Godzilla (2016)
 Satoshi: A Move for Tomorrow (2016)
 The Age of Shadows (2016) - Higashi
 Poetry Angel (2017) - Tsutomu's father
 Shiori (2018)
 Walking with My Grandma (2018)
 Wish You Were Here (2018)
 Masquerade Hotel (2019) - Takura
 Journey of the Sky Goddess (2019)
 Amber Light (2019)
 Shadowfall (2019)
 The Flowers of Evil (2019)
 Project Dream: How to Build Mazinger Z's Hangar (2020)
 Daughters (2020)
 All the Things We Never Said (2020) - Tashiro
 Silent Tokyo (2020)
 Living in the Sky (2020)
 The Sun Stands Still (2021) - Mantarō Kawakami
 Rurouni Kenshin: The Final (2021) - Chief Uramura
 Caution, Hazardous Wife: The Movie (2021)
 The Road to Murder: The Movie (2021)
 In the Wake (2021)
 Masquerade Night (2021) - Takura
 A Madder Red (2021)
 Usogui (2022)
 Cherry Magic! the Movie (2022)
 Goodbye Cruel World (2022)
 Tokyo MER: Mobile Emergency Room: The Movie (2023) - Shūsei Kugayama

Television
 Kinpachi-sensei (1979)
 Kusa Moeru (1979) - Manju
 Mujaki na Kankei (1984)
 School Wars (1984)
 Ponytail wa Furimukanai (1985)
 Chikyoudai (1985)
 Yonimo Kimyona Monogatari: 1990 Okujou Fuukei (1990)
 Yonimo Kimyona Monogatari: 1991 Miminari (1991)
 Yonimo Kimyona Monogatari: 1991 Himitsu no Hanazono (1991)
 Sugao no Mama de (1992)
 Onichan no Sentaku (1994)
 Station (1995)
 Heart ni S (1995)
 Koi wa Aserazu (1998) 
 Man, Next Natural Girl: 100 Nights In Yokohama (1999)
 Taiyou wa Shizumanai (2000)
 Kabachitare (2001)
 Aibou 2 (2003)
 Ichiban Taisetsu na Hito wa Dare Desu ka (2004)
 Onna no Ichidaiki (2005)
 Kiken na Aneki (2005)
 Hoshi ni Negai wo (2005)
 Shiawase ni Naritai! (2005)
 Koi ni Ochitara (2005)
 Makeinu no Toboe (2005)
 Yoshitsune (2005) - Taira no Munemori
 Gekidan Engimono Beautiful Sunday (2005)
 Kurosagi (2006)
 Hana Yori Dango 2 (2007)
 Yukan Club (2007)
 Kagerō no Tsuji Inemuri Iwane Edo Zōshi (2007–09) - Nakai Hanzō
 Okasan, Boku ga Umarete Gomen Nasai (2007)
 Shin Machiben (2007)
 Team Batista no Eikō (2008)
 Kasouken no Onna: 2008 Special (2008)
 Atashinchi no Danshi (2009)
 Otomen (2009)
 Kagero no Tsuji 3 (2009)
 Tenchijin (2009) - Akechi Mitsuhide
 Reinoryokusha Odagiri Kyoko no Uso (2010)
 Saka no Ue no Kumo (2010) - Toshitane Matsukawa
 Kamen Rider Fourze (2011)
 Ningen Konchuki (2011)
 Brutus no Shinzo (2011)
 Lady: Saigo no Hanzai Profile (2011)
 Umechan Sensei (2012)
 Flower - Maeda Atusko's FullVideo version (2012)
 Gunshi Kanbei (2014) - Kobayakawa Takakage
 When a Tree Falls (2018) - Tadayuki Ishibashi
 The Road to Murder (2020)
 Shikatanakatta to Iute wa Ikan no desu (2021)
 Galápagos (2023)

Video games
 Yakuza 0 as Tsukasa Sagawa (2015)

References

External links
 
 
 

Living people
Japanese male film actors
Japanese male television actors
1964 births
Seikei University alumni
20th-century Japanese male actors
21st-century Japanese male actors